Somali pirates have threatened international shipping with piracy since the beginning of the Somali Civil War in the early 1990s. This list documents those ships attacked in 2011: for other years, see List of ships attacked by Somali pirates.

January

February

March

April

May

August

September

November

External links
European Union Naval Force-Somalia, Key Facts and Figures

References

Piracy in Somalia

2011 in Somalia
Somalia transport-related lists
2011-related lists